The Western Canada Summer Games (WCSG) were established in 1975 as a multi-sport event to provide development opportunities for amateur athletes and to help them advance their skills in a competitive, but friendly environment. Athletes range in age between 13 years of age and 23 years of age.

The games also serve to broaden the exposure of talented athletes and provide a training ground for national and international level competitions. Social and cultural elements round out the sporting events for athletes.  The competitors for the WCSG consist of athletes from three Western Provinces Alberta, Saskatchewan, and Manitoba, and the three Territories (Yukon, Northwest Territories, and Nunavut).

History 
Over several decades in all areas of Western Canada there had been a remarkable hosting of sports competitions of all kinds held under a wide variety of authorities. These had been local and area competitions, regional and provincial games, some featuring many sports, some held in the winter season, some in the summer, and some staged indoors with others, outdoors. Some of the competitions had varied in recognition and sanctions from national sport governing bodies while others didn't. Most of the competitions had age restrictions and/or scholastic or geographic restrictions of some kind. As a result, people concerned closely with the development of athletes and sport started to take a long critical look at what was going on in Western Canada.

This concern led one provincial government to engage in one-on-one talks with its sport federations which then led to larger group talks, then formal meetings and conferences that viewed, reviewed and overviewed the total situation. The final conclusion was that the existing sport competitions were not developing athletes of national and international calibre and were not providing adequate outlets for greater recognition of many sports and their athletes. That conclusion was not a criticism of the benefits of existing sports programs but recognition that athletes were not progressing along the continuum to achieve national and international results.

The various provincial games of 1972 combined to form the idea of staging major multi-sport games event in Western Canada based on the highly demanding rules and regulations of international Games, which would attract the greatest number of Western Canadian athletes for open competition. By 1973, the final refined idea was a major program that would provide Western Canadian athletes with an opportunity to train for and participate in high standard competition as well as create an interest in some lesser-known sports on the part of younger athletes.

The Western Canada Summer Games were officially launched in Regina, Saskatchewan in August 1975, in a pre-Olympic Games year along with the decision to hold the Games every four years, one year ahead of the Olympic Games, and using the same 23 summer sports disciplines.
In 1983, the Yukon and Northwest Territories applied for membership to the Games and debuted with a total of 23 athletes between the two territories.

Following the 1987 Western Canada Summer Games, a review of the Games was conducted and it was agreed that the purpose of the games should be to provide developing athletes with an opportunity to compete in competitions that support provincial or territorial plans and which might lead to greater competitions at the national level (i.e. Canada Games, National Championships, etc.).

The 1990 Western Canada Summer Games held in Winnipeg, Manitoba, saw provincial and territorial team sizes grow to in excess of 700 athletes and coaches participating in 31 sports with the focus shifting from the original pre Olympic showcase of the "Best in the West", to a more broad approach that allowed each individual sport to determine an age group for their sport. This approach proved to be beyond the financial capacities of the provinces/territories to sustain and the mix of categories was deemed difficult for hosts to market and for provinces/territories to rationalize their involvement.

At the 1995 Games in Abbotsford, B.C., team sizes were reduced to approximately 500 athletes and coaches participating in 23 sports with many of them focusing on developmental age groups. During the Ministers meeting in 1995, direction was given to the Western Canada Games Council by the Ministers to further reduce the teams to a limit of 400 participants and to determine a "fit" for the Games.  Alberta and Yukon withdrew from the Western Canada Games following the 1995 Games due to lack of clear fit for the Games. The Northwest Territories increased the size of their team and brought a record 152 athletes to participate.

By the 1999 Games in Prince Albert, Saskatchewan, team sizes had been reduced to approximately 400 and more sports were fitting into the model of developing athlete's age of eligibility for the next Canada Games (especially in the case of Canada Summer Games team sports). For these reasons, Alberta agreed and was reinstated in the Games. The Yukon Territory was also welcomed back to the Games family.

In June 2003, Nunavut debuted as the third Territory to participate, and brought the total membership of the Western Canada Summer Games to 7 jurisdictions.

The current rationale for the Western Canada Summer Games is to bi-sect the Canada Summer Games cycle (the Technical Packages are aligned two years younger than the Canada Summer Games ages where possible) and provides an opportunity for top age-class athletes to test their athletic talent against the best in the west.

On April 15, 2016, the Province of British Columbia withdrew Team BC from the Western Canada Summer Games, including the upcoming 2019 Games in Swift Current, Saskatchewan, citing fiscal constraints and the return on investment by funding a provincial team to these specific games.

Until further notice, the Western Canada Summer Games program has been suspended.

Sports 

The following is a list of 37 sports that have been a part of a Western Canada Summer Games event:

Events by year

2011 Western Canada Summer Games

The Kamloops, British Columbia 2011 Western Canada Summer Games were held August 5–14, 2011 in Kamloops B.C. and included two phases.

Phased events

Quick facts 
Stage of Athlete:	Train to Train - technical packages are aligned two years younger than Canada Summer Games
Age Range:		13 – 23
Frequency:		Quadrennial (bi-sects the Canada Summer Games)
Athlete Numbers:	2,300 total (425 maximum team size)
Coaching Numbers:	400 total (team size is 69)
Coaching Certification:	NCCP Level 3 or equivalent under the new NCCP for the head coach
Sports:			19
Volunteers Required:	3,000
Technical Officials:	300
Days of Competition:	10

Hosts

Medal count 
This is the medal count from the 2007 Western Canada Summer Games

See also

Canada Games
Canada Summer Games
Canada Winter Games
Quebec Games
BC Games
BC Summer Games
BC Winter Games
Alberta Winter Games
Saskatchewan Games
Manitoba Games
Ontario Games

Notes

References

 Memo from the Province of British Columbia announcing withdrawal from the games

External links 
 http://www.2011wcsg.ca/
 http://www.2011wcsg.com/wp-content/uploads/2011/02/Sport-Schedule1.pdf

Multi-sport events in Canada
Recurring sporting events established in 1975
Sport in Western Canada